Captain Amarinder Singh (born 11 March 1942), is an Indian politician, military historian, former royal and Indian Army veteran who served as the 15th Chief Minister of Punjab. A former Member of the Legislative Assembly, Punjab and Member of Parliament, Lok Sabha, he was also the president of Punjab Pradesh Congress Committee. He has also previously served as the Chief Minister of Punjab from 2002 to 2007 and 2017 to 2021. His father was the last Maharaja of the princely state of Patiala. He has also served in the Indian Army from 1963 to 1966. In 1980, he won a seat in the Lok Sabha for the first time. As of November 2022, Singh also serves as the chairman of the Punjab Urdu Academy. Captain Singh resigned as the Chief Minister of Punjab on 18 September 2021. On 19 September, 2022 he merged his party PLC with BJP and joined BJP on the same day.

Personal life

Singh was born on 11 March 1942 in Patiala City, Patiala State, Punjab Province, British India into a royal Punjabi Jatt Sikh family of the Sidhu clan to parents Maharaja Sir Yadavindra Singh and Maharani Mohinder Kaur of Patiala. Amarinder Singh's family belongs to the Phulkian dynasty. He attended the Loreto Convent in Shimla, and Lawrence School in Kasauli, Solan District, before going to The Doon School in Dehradun. He has one son, Raninder Singh, and one daughter, Jai Inder Kaur. His wife, Preneet Kaur, served as an Member of Parliament and was Minister of State in the Ministry of External Affairs from 2009 to October 2012.

His elder sister Heminder Kaur is married to former Foreign Minister K. Natwar Singh. He is also related to Shiromani Akali Dal (A) supremo and former IPS Officer Simranjit Singh Mann. Mann's wife and Amarinder Singh's wife, Preneet Kaur, are sisters.

Army career

Singh served in the Indian Army from June 1963 to December 1966 after graduating from the National Defence Academy and the Indian Military Academy. He was commissioned into the Sikh Regiment. He served as the aide-de-camp to the General Officer Commanding-in-Chief Western Command, Lieutenant General Harbaksh Singh, from December 1964. He left the army in early 1965 to look after his family but returned to service with the start of the 1965 Indo-Pakistan War.

His father and grandfather were also in army and many times he said that "Army will always be my first love".

Political career

He was inducted into the Congress by Rajiv Gandhi, who was his friend from school and was first elected to the Lok Sabha in 1980. In 1984, he resigned from Parliament and from Congress as a protest against the Army action during Operation Blue Star. Subsequently, he joined the Shiromani Akali Dal was elected to the state legislature from Talwandi Sabo and became a minister in the state government for Agriculture, Forest, Development and Panchayats.

In 1992 he broke away from the Akali Dal and formed a splinter group named Shiromani Akali Dal (Panthic) which later merged with the Congress in 1998 (after his party's crushing defeat in Vidhan Sabha election in which he himself was defeated from his own constituency where he got only 856 votes) after Sonia Gandhi took over the reins of the party. He was defeated by Prof Prem Singh Chandumajra from Patiala Constituency in 1998 by a margin of 33,251 votes. He served as the President of Punjab Pradesh Congress Committee on three occasions from 1999 to 2002, 2010 to 2013 and 2015 to 2017.

He has been a member of the Punjab Vidhan Sabha for five terms representing Patiala (Urban) thrice, Samana and Talwandi Sabo once each.

Chief Minister of Punjab, First term
He became Chief Minister of Punjab in 2002 and continued until 2007.

In September 2008, a special committee of Punjab Vidhan Sabha, during the tenure of a government led by Akali Dal-Bharatiya Janata Party, expelled him on the count of regularities in the transfer of land related to the Amritsar Improvement Trust. In 2010, the Supreme Court of India held his expulsion unconstitutional on the grounds that it was excessive and unconstitutional.

He was appointed as chairman of Punjab Congress Campaign Committee in 2008. Captain Amarinder Singh is also a Permanent Invitee to the Congress Working Committee since 2013.

Member of Parliament
He defeated senior BJP leader Arun Jaitley by a margin of more than 102,000 votes in 2014 general elections.

On 27 November 2015, Amarinder Singh was appointed President of Punjab Congress in the run up to Punjab elections slated for 2017.

Chief Minister of Punjab, second term

On 11 March 2017 Congress Party won the 2017 Punjab Legislative Assembly election under his leadership. Amarinder Singh was sworn in as the 26th Chief Minister of Punjab on 16 March 2017 at Punjab Raj Bhavan, Chandigarh. The oath of office was administered by the Punjab governor, V.P. Singh Badnore. He was appointed president of the Jat Mahasabha in 2013.

During his tenure as chief minister, he came into conflict with a faction of the Congress headed by Navjot Singh Sidhu, and was criticized for being inaccessible to Congress MLAs, living in a farmhouse on the outskirts of Chandigarh instead of coming to the civil secretariat building. He also received criticism for not resolving the Bargari sacrilege case and for a perception that he had been insufficiently zealous in prosecuting previous CM Parkash Singh Badal for involvement in the case.

On 18 September 2021, he resigned as the Chief Minister of Punjab, as a consequence of conversations with the Congress high command that suggested the Punjab Congress MLAs were lacking confidence in his leadership. Singh publicly blamed Sidhu for the internal tension that led to the resignation, calling him "dangerous", "incompetent", and a "total disaster" and that he would fight any attempt to name Sidhu as the next CM of Punjab. Singh was eventually succeeded by Charanjit Singh Channi as the new chief minister.

Singh left the Congress Party, and on 28 October 2021, announced that he would be floating a new party soon and that he would be allying with the Bharatiya Janata Party.

Punjab Lok Congress
Punjab Lok Congress (PLC; English: Punjab People's Congress) is an Indian regional political party, in Punjab founded by  Singh on 2 November 2021 after he resigned as Chief Minister of Punjab and quit the Indian National Congress. The party was formed following a split in Indian National Congress in Punjab. Singh has announced that his party will contest on all 117 seats in 2022 Punjab Legislative Assembly election. The party failed to win any seat in the elections.

2022 Punjab Assembly election
In 2022 Punjab Legislative Assembly election, Singh lost from the Patiala assembly constituency to Aam Aadmi Party's Ajit Pal Singh Kohli. The party failed to win any seat in the elections.

Bharatiya Janata Party 
A few months after his election failure Singh along with his party merged into the Bharatiya Janata Party on 19 September 2022 after meeting with HM Amit Shah a few days before.

Books

He has also written books on war and Sikh history which include A Ridge Too Far, Lest We Forget, The Last Sunset: Rise and Fall of Lahore Durbar and The Sikhs in Britain: 150 years of Photographs. Among his most recent works are Honour and Fidelity: India's Military Contribution to the Great War 1914 to 1918 released in Chandigarh on 6 December 2014, and The Monsoon War: Young Officers Reminisce – 1965 India-Pakistan War- which contains his memoirs of the 1965 Indo-Pak war.

Awards and recognition 

The author Khushwant Singh released a biographic book titled, Captain Amarinder Singh: The People’s Maharaja in 2017.

References

|-

|-

|-

 

1942 births
The Doon School alumni
Living people
Maharajas of Patiala
People from Patiala
Punjabi people
Chief Ministers of Punjab, India
Pretenders
Indian Sikhs
Shiromani Akali Dal politicians
Lawrence School, Sanawar alumni
India MPs 1980–1984
Punjab, India MLAs 2002–2007
Indian Army personnel
Punjab, India MLAs 2007–2012
Punjab, India MLAs 2012–2017
Lok Sabha members from Punjab, India
India MPs 2014–2019
Chief ministers from Indian National Congress
Indian National Congress politicians
Punjab, India MLAs 2017–2022
Punjab Lok Congress politicians
Bharatiya Janata Party politicians from Punjab